Kunzea petrophila is a flowering plant in the myrtle family, Myrtaceae and is endemic to the Northern Territory. It is a spreading shrub with hairy branches and leaves, narrow leaves and cream-coloured flowers in more or less spherical groups, usually on the ends of the main branches.

Description
The flowers are arranged in groups of between ten and eighteen near the ends of the main branches, or in smaller groups on short side shoots. The flowers are sessile with bracts and  bracteoles at the base of the flowers. Flowering has been observed in May, August and November.

Taxonomy and naming
Kunzea petrophila was first formally described in 2016 by Hellmut R. Toelken and the description was published in Journal of the Adelaide Botanic Garden. The specific epithet (petrophila) is derived from the Ancient Greek πέτρα (pétra) meaning "rock" or "stone" and φίλος (phílos) meaning "dear" or "beloved" referring to this species often growing on sandstone cliffs.

Distribution and habitat
This kunzea grows in sand in sheltered sandstone crevices along the Keep River in the Keep River National Parkin the Northern Territory.

References

petrophila
Flora of the Northern Territory
Myrtales of Australia
Plants described in 2016
Endemic flora of Australia
Taxa named by Hellmut R. Toelken